Frank Joshua North (10 March 1840 – 15 March 1885), was an American interpreter, United States Army officer and politician. He is most well known for organizing and leading the Pawnee Scouts from 1865 to 1877. His brother Luther H. North also led the Scouts.

Early life 
Frank Joshua North was born in Manhattan, New York on March 10, 1840. He had an older brother James E. North, born in Ohio, where their parents Thomas J. and Jane E. North had moved from their native Tompkins County, New York. His parents returned to Ohio, where his brother Luther H. North was born, followed by two younger sisters.  In 1856, at the age of 16, Frank moved to Nebraska and worked as a transporter, moving goods between Omaha, Nebraska and Fort Kearny. During this time, North made contact with the Pawnee Indians, befriended them and learned the Pawnee language. In 1860, North was working as a clerk and interpreter at the Pawnee Agency trading post in Genoa, Nebraska.

Military 
In 1864, Major General Samuel R. Curtis approached North to have him organize a company of Pawnee scouts to serve in the Union army. In 1865, he organized Company A of the Pawnee Scouts, and was appointed the rank of First Lieutenant and then Captain. While commanding the scouts, Captain North fought at Crazy Woman's Fork, participated in the Powder River Massacre, and fought in the Battle of Tongue River, all of which took place in August 1865 in Dakota Territory. On July 11, 1869, he fought with his scouts at the Battle of Summit Springs in Colorado Territory. After the battle, North claimed to have shot and killed the Cheyenne chief Tall Bull. He also participated in the Dull Knife Fight on November 25, 1876. Frank North was promoted to the rank of major and mustered out of the Army in 1877.

Later life 
Frank North served one term in the Nebraska State Legislature from 1871 to 1872. He was then a ranching partner with William F. Cody in a cattle ranch in western Nebraska on the Dismal River. He disposed of his interest in 1882, and then joined Buffalo Bill's Wild West as manager of the American Indians. He sustained serious injuries (including seven broken ribs) in a horse accident in Hartford, Connecticut in 1884. As a result of his injuries and the following illness, Frank Joshua North died on March 15, 1885, in Columbus, Platte County, Nebraska. In 1958, he was inducted into the Hall of Great Westerners of the National Cowboy & Western Heritage Museum.

References

Pawnee
People from Nance County, Nebraska
1885 deaths
1840 births
Ranchers from Nebraska